The Southern Great Plain is a statistical (NUTS 2) region of Hungary. It is part of Great Plain and North (NUTS 1) region. The Southern Great Plain includes three counties:

 Bács-Kiskun
 Békés
 Csongrád-Csanád

See also
List of regions of Hungary

References 

NUTS 2 statistical regions of the European Union